Brian George Wilde (13 June 1927 – 20 March 2008) was an English actor, best known for his roles in television comedy, most notably Mr Barrowclough in Porridge and Walter "Foggy" Dewhurst in Last of the Summer Wine. His lugubrious world-weary face was a staple of British television for forty years.

Career
Though born in Ashton-under-Lyne, Lancashire, Wilde was brought up in Devon and Hertfordshire and attended Hertford Grammar School. He trained as an actor at RADA.

He had an early uncredited role as a small-time crook in the film Forbidden Cargo (1954), starring Jack Warner and Nigel Patrick, and a small but significant dramatic part in the horror film Night of the Demon (1957). His early television work included the series The Love of Mike (1960) and supporting Tony Hancock in episodes of his ATV series in 1963. Wilde also played Detective Superintendent Halcro in a series of two-part thrillers about undercover Scotland Yard officers, The Men from Room Thirteen (BBC, 1959–61). He had minor roles in films such as Life for Ruth (1962), The Bargee (1964), The Jokers (1967) and Carry On Doctor (1967), and on television in Room at the Bottom (1966–67) as Mr Salisbury. 

His first major television success was in 1970 as refuse depot manager "Bloody Delilah" in the ITV sitcom The Dustbinmen. He showed his sinister side as the mischievous magician Mr Peacock in the children's drama series Ace of Wands between 1970 and 1972. That year he starred as a murderer in The Uninvited, an episode of the BBC's supernatural thriller series Out of the Unknown. Also in 1971, in the television drama Elizabeth R, Wilde played the efficient, merciless 'rackmaster' Richard Topcliffe, who was charged with the torture of prisoners in the Tower of London. He played a character in the 1970s British children's series The Ghosts of Motley Hall, by Richard Carpenter.

Porridge
In 1973, he starred as a different kind of gaoler in the second episode of Seven of One, a series of seven individual stories, all of which starred Ronnie Barker. In the episode, entitled "Prisoner and Escort", Wilde played Mr Barrowclough, one of two prison officers whose job it is to escort Barker's character Fletcher across the moors to his prison (the other was Mr Mackay, played by Fulton Mackay). The episode proved successful and a series was commissioned by the BBC, titled Porridge. Wilde reprised his role as the timid and eager-to-please Barrowclough. Porridge which ran until 1977, was a great success, with a film version being made in 1979.

Last of the Summer Wine
Wilde gained and established another role in 1976, when he took over from Michael Bates as the third member of a trio of old men in the BBC sitcom Last of the Summer Wine. The character, Walter "Foggy" Dewhurst, was a determined ex-army man who planned the group's misadventures with military precision and a painstaking eye for detail. Wilde saw the long-running series gather momentum and continue its success; he stayed with the series for nine years, before leaving in 1985 to work on other projects. Foggy was written out of the series and was replaced by Michael Aldridge as Seymour Utterthwaite.

When Aldridge left Last of the Summer Wine, Wilde returned as Foggy in 1990. He stayed until 1996, when he contracted shingles during the preparations for series 19 and decided to leave. Frank Thornton was invited to join the cast to replace Wilde, making his debut in the 1997 Christmas special "There Goes The Groom!". Wilde never returned to the programme, despite several invitations to do so.

Other work
He featured in "The Fear Merchants", an episode of ABC's The Avengers, in January 1967. In this he played Jeremy Raven, a ceramics manufacturer caught up in a sinister plot to get rid of the competition. In 1978, Wilde voiced the public information film series Play Safe, highlighting the dangers of overhead power lines to children.

He also supplied the voice of the magician Meredith in the children's animated series Alias the Jester, Shortie the Giraffe in Coco Pops and narrated an animated series, Microscopic Milton, about a microscopic little chap who lives in a clock on the mantelpiece, in the parlour of the house that belongs to a lady called Mrs. Witherspoon. Wilde starred in his own BBC series in 1988, Wyatt's Watchdogs, as retired soldier Major Wyatt who forms his own neighbourhood watch group. As a stuffy ex-army member who leads a motley bunch of comic characters, Wyatt was quite similar to Foggy. The programme, which co-starred Trevor Bannister, was written by Miles Tredinnick and ran for one series of six episodes.

Death
Wilde suffered a fall in January 2008 from which he never recovered. He died in his sleep on the morning of 20 March 2008 at his home in Ware, Hertfordshire and was survived by his wife Eva, their son Andrew and daughter Sarah. 

His son, Andrew Wilde, had been film editor on Last of the Summer Wine from the mid-1990s until the final episode in 2010, working initially on many of the episodes that had starred his father and later on the Frank Thornton editions.

Partial filmography

Film

 Street Corner (1953) – Pinky – Bogus Detective Sgt (uncredited)
 Will Any Gentleman...? (1953) – 1st Clerk
 Forbidden Cargo (1954) – Smuggler at Airfield (uncredited)
 Simon and Laura (1955) – Peter Harbottle
 Now and Forever (1956) – Policeman (uncredited)
 Tiger in the Smoke (1956) – Trumps
 Interpol (1957) – The Monk
 Night of the Demon (1957) – Rand Hobart
 The Gypsy and the Gentleman (1958) – (uncredited)
 Girls at Sea (1958) – Bill
 Corridors of Blood (1958) – Man in Operating Theatre Audience (uncredited)
 Subway in the Sky (1959)
 Beyond the Curtain (1960) – Bill Seddon
  Scotland Yard (film series) (1961) - The Never Never Murder - Porter
 Life for Ruth (1962) – Newspaper Photographer (uncredited)
 We Joined the Navy (1962) – Petty Officer Gibbons
 West 11 (1963) – Speaker
 The Informers (1963) – Lipson
 The Man Who Finally Died (1963) – Cemetery Superintendent (uncredited)
 The Bargee (1964) – Policeman
 Rattle of a Simple Man (1964) – Fred
 Darling (1965) – Willett
 Morgan: A Suitable Case for Treatment (1966) – Mr. Gilbert (uncredited)
 Rasputin the Mad Monk (1966) – Vassily's Father (uncredited)
 The Jokers (1967) – Sgt. Catchpole
 You Only Live Twice (1967) – 1st Policeman (uncredited)
 Carry On Doctor (1967) – Man from Cox & Carter
 Connecting Rooms (1970) – Ellerman
 Goodbye Gemini (1970) – Taxi Driver
 Carry On Henry (1971) – Warder (scenes deleted)
 One Brief Summer (1971) – Lambert
 No Sex Please, We're British (1973) – Policeman
 Alfie Darling (1975) – Doctor
 To the Devil a Daughter (1976) – Black Room Attendant
 Adventures of a Taxi Driver (1976) – Harold
 Porridge (1979) – Barrowclough

Television

References

External links
 
 
 Wyatt's Watchdogs site
 Photos on Pinterest
Obituaries
 The Independent, 21 March 2008
 The Times, 21 March 2008
 The Guardian, 24 March 2008

1927 births
2008 deaths
People from Ashton-under-Lyne
English male television actors
English male film actors
Alumni of RADA
Male actors from Lancashire
20th-century English male actors
People educated at Hertford Grammar School
British male comedy actors